Ladygin is a Russian masculine surname, its feminine counterpart is Ladygina. Notable people with the surname include:

Kirill Ladygin (born 1978), Russian auto racing driver
Nadezhda Ladygina-Kohts (1889–1963), Russian zoopsychologist

Russian-language surnames